Giovanni Rispoli (Naples, 1838 -) was an Italian engraver.

Biography
He was a resident of Naples, where he studied at the Academy of Fine Arts. He won medals at the Exposition of the Mostra Marittima di Naples, and the medal completed for the Società Pellattieri of Naples. Giovanni Rispoli helped decorate (1901) the facade of the Sanctuary of the Holy Virgin of the Rosary in Pompei.

References

1836 births
19th-century Italian painters
Italian male painters
Painters from Naples
Year of death missing
19th-century Italian male artists